BJ Crook (born 29 June 1984) is a New Zealand cricketer. He played in nine first-class, twelve List A, and six Twenty20 matches for Wellington in 2008 and 2009.

See also
 List of Wellington representative cricketers

References

External links
 

1984 births
Living people
New Zealand cricketers
Wellington cricketers
Cricketers from Lower Hutt